Draco melanopogon, commonly known as the black-bearded gliding lizard or black-barbed flying dragon, is a species of  agamid "flying lizard" endemic to Southeast Asia. It is a typically forest-dwelling arboreal lizard. It preys on small invertebrates like ants and is oviparous. They are notable for relying solely on dewlap-mediated communication, instead of conveying signals via both headbobbing and employing dewlaps, as is typical for lizards with dewlaps.

References

Further reading
 Boulenger GA. 1887. Catalogue of the Lizards in the British Museum (Natural History). Second Edition. Volume III. ... London: Trustees of the British Museum (Natural History). (Taylor and Francis, printers). xii + 575 pp. + Plates I- XL. (Draco melanopogon, new species, p. 492).
 Das I. 2006. A Photographic Guide to Snakes and Other Reptiles of Borneo. Sanibel Island Florida: Ralph Curtis Books. 144 pp. . (Draco melanopogon, p. 79).

External links

 Draco melanopogon entry at Ecology Asia website

Reptiles of Borneo
Reptiles of Southeast Asia
melanopogon
Reptiles described in 1887
Taxa named by George Albert Boulenger